Estellina Conat was an Italian-Jewish printer. She was the first woman active as a printer. 

She was married to the Jewish physician Abraham Conat of Mantua and Ferrara, who founded the first Jewish printing press in 1475. She was active in the family printing press business independently of her spouse.

See also
 Anna Rugerin
 Anna Fabri

References

Sources
 The JPS Guide to Jewish Women: 600 B.C.E.to 1900 C.E.
 Anna Bellavitis: Women’s Work and Rights in Early Modern Urban Europe
 https://jwa.org/encyclopedia/article/printers

Italian printers
Italian typographers and type designers
Women in publishing
15th-century Italian women
Women printers
15th-century printers
Medieval businesswomen
Year of birth unknown
Year of death unknown
15th-century Italian businesspeople
15th-century Italian Jews
Medieval Jewish women